This is a list of player transfers involving Top 14 teams before or during the 2021–22 season. The list is of deals that are confirmed and are either from or to a rugby union team in the Top 14 during the 2020–21 season. It is not unknown for confirmed deals to be cancelled at a later date. Perpignan were promoted to the Top 14 following the 2020–21 Rugby Pro D2 season whilst Agen were relegated to Rugby Pro D2 following the 2020–21 season. Biarritz were then also promoted after defeating Bayonne in the promotion-relegation match, with Bayonne relegated to the Rugby Pro D2 for the 2021–22 season.

Biarritz

Players In
 Antoine Erbani from  Pau 
 Clément Darbo from  Provence 
 Zakaria El Fakir from  Bordeaux
 Josh Tyrell from  Oyonnax 
 Tomás Cubelli from  Western Force
 Quentin Samaran from  Beziers 
 Brett Herron from  Harlequins
 Tevita Kuridrani from  Western Force
 James Cronin from  Munster
 Vincent Martin from  Montpellier
 Elliot Dixon from  Black Rams Tokyo
 Bastien Soury from  Toulon

Players Out
 Gaëtan Robert to  Suresnes
 Gauthier Doubrere to  Mont-de-Marsan
 Willie du Plessis to  Mont-de-Marsan
 Thomas Synaeghel retired 
 Steven David to  Valence Romans
 Lucas Lebraud to  Narbonne
 James Hart to  Bordeaux

Bordeaux

Players In
 Bastien Vergnes-Taillfer from  Colomiers
 Louis Picamoles from  Montpellier
 François Trinh-Duc from  Racing 92 
 Pierre Bochaton from  Bourg-en-Bresse
 Thomas Jolmès from  Toulon 
 Alban Roussel from  Perpignan
 Pablo Dimcheff from  Soyaux Angoulême
 Louis Bielle-Biarrey from  Grenoble
 Federico Mori from  Calvisano
 James Hart from  Biarritz

Players Out
 Marco Tauleigne to  Montpellier 
 Ben Botica to  Castres 
 Zakaria El Fakir to  Biarritz
 Alexandre Flanquart to  Provence 
 Beka Gorgadze to  Pau
 Baptiste Castanier to  Langon
 Bautista Delguy to  Perpignan
 Laurent Delboulbès retired
 Scott Higginbotham retired
 Alexandre Borie to  Vannes

Brive

Players In
 Daniel Brennan from  Montpellier 
 Paul Abadie from  Agen
 Tevita Ratuva from  Scarlets 
 Enzo Sanga from  Valence Romans
 Andrés Zafra from  Agen
 Dylan Lam from  Kumeu

Players Out
 Julien Blanc to  Toulon 
 Eneriko Buliruarua to  La Rochelle
 Quentin Delord to  Montauban
 David Delarue to  Aurillac 
 Dan Malafosse to  Montauban 
 Brandon Nansen to  Northampton Saints 
 Peet Marais retired 
 Badri Alkhazashvili to  Nice
 Mesake Doge to  Dragons
 Irakli Tskhadadze to  Soyaux Angoulême

Castres

Players In
 Levan Chilachava from  Montpellier
 Ben Botica from  Bordeaux 
 Pierre Aguillon from  La Rochelle 
 Quentin Walcker from  Perpignan
 Josaia Raisuqe from  Nevers 
 Théo Hannoyer from  Valence Romans 
 Thomas Larregain from  Colomiers
 Antoine Guillamon from  Montpellier
 Crimson Tukino from  Grenoble
 Feybian Tukino from  Grenoble
 River Tukino from  Grenoble
 Teariki Ben-Nicholas from  Highlanders 
 Antoine Zeghdar from  Oyonnax
 Brendan Lebrun from  Vannes
 Nick Champion de Crespigny from  Sydney University
 Brice Humbert from  Valence Romans
 Jack Whetton from  NSW Waratahs
 Mateaki Kafatolu from  Petone

Players Out
 Anthony Jelonch to  Toulouse 
 Yann David to  Bayonne
 Thomas Fortunel to  Grenoble 
 Hans N'Kinsi to  Provence 
 Armand Batlle retired 
 Florian Vialelle to  Oyonnax
 Kévin Firmin to  Montauban 
 Marc-Antoine Rallier retired 
 Daniel Kötze released
 Lucas Pointud returned to  Pau
 Maama Vaipulu released
 Dorian Clerc to  Provence
 Pierre Tatre to  Graulhet

Clermont

Players In
 Tomás Lavanini from  Leicester Tigers 
 JJ Hanrahan from  Munster
 Marvin O'Connor from  France Sevens (short-term deal)

Players Out
 Peter Betham to  Provence
 Taylor Gontineac to  Rouen
 Quentin Beaudaux to  Nevers (season-long loan)
 Kevin Noah to  Nevers (season-long loan)
 Tim Nanai-Williams to  Toulouse 
 Rory Jennings to  London Irish
 Reinach Venter to  Albi

La Rochelle

Players In
 Jonathan Danty from  Stade Français 
 Pierre Popelin from  Vannes
 Rémi Picquette from  Vannes 
 Eneriko Buliruarua from  Brive
 Guram Papidze from  Nevers 
 Joel Sclavi from  Jaguares XV
 Motu Matu'u from  London Irish (short-term deal)
 Kavekini Tabu from  Fiji Sevens

Players Out
 Geoffrey Doumayrou to  Montpellier 
 Pierre Aguillon to  Castres
 Gabriel Lacroix retired 
 Rémi Leroux to  Vannes 
 Loni Uhila to  Hyères 
 Zeno Kieft retired 
 Raphael Sanchez to  Montauban 
 César Baudin to  Niort
 Matthieu Thomas to  Valence d'Agen 
 Arthur Joly to  Perpignan 
 Thomas Carol to  Pau 
 Lopeti Timani to  Toulon
 Darren Sweetnam to  Oyonnax 
 Marcel van der Merwe to  London Irish
 Kevin Gourdon retired

Lyon

Players In
 Romain Taofifénua from  Toulon 
 Lima Sopoaga from  Wasps 
 Beka Saghinadze from  Aurillac 
 Davit Niniashvili from  Khvamli
 Tavite Veredamu from  France Sevens
 Guillaume Marchand from  Toulouse
 Sébastien Taofifénua from  Toulon
 Jérôme Rey from  Grenoble
 Joel Kpoku from  Saracens

Players Out
 Jonathan Wisniewski retired
 Izack Rodda to  Western Force
 Jérémie Maurouard to  Montpellier
 Victor Barnier to  Aubenas Vals
 Rémy Grosso retired 
 Kévin Yaméogo to  Pau
 Gillian Galan retired 
 Alex Tulou to  Dax
 Louis Druart to  Montauban (season-long loan)
 Joe Taufeteʻe to  LA Giltinis

Montpellier

Players In
 Marco Tauleigne from  Bordeaux
 Masivesi Dakuwaqa from  Toulon 
 Geoffrey Doumayrou from  La Rochelle
 Malik Hamadache from  Pau  
 Zach Mercer from  Bath 
 Josua Vici from  Colomiers 
 Brandon Paenga-Amosa from  Queensland Reds
 Jérémie Maurouard from  Lyon
 Pierre Lucas from  Perpignan
 Paolo Garbisi from  Benetton
 Henry Thomas from  Bath

Players Out
 Levan Chilachava to  Castres
 Daniel Brennan to  Brive
 Louis Picamoles to  Bordeaux
 Youri Delhommel to  Pau 
 Jacques du Plessis to  Bulls
 Johan Goosen to  Bulls
 Henry Immelman to  Edinburgh
 Antoine Guillamon to  Castres
 Alex Lozowski returned to  Saracens
 Jules Danglot to  Toulon
 Caleb Timu retired
 Vincent Martin to  Biarritz
 Bismarck du Plessis to  Bulls
 Gabriel Ibitoye to  Tel Aviv Heat
 Martin Devergie to  Agen (season-long loan)

Pau

Players In
 Nathan Decron from  Agen
 Rémi Seneca from  Vannes
 Reece Hewat from  Aurillac 
 Youri Delhommel from  Montpellier
 Beka Gorgadze from  Bordeaux
 Siate Tokolahi from  Highlanders 
 Thomas Carol from  La Rochelle
 Mathias Colombet from  France Sevens
 Steve Cummins from  Melbourne Rebels
 Thibault Hamonou from  Toulouse
 Jack Maddocks from  NSW Waratahs
 Paul Tailhades from  Montauban
 Kévin Yaméogo from  Lyon
 Zack Henry from  Leicester Tigers
 Daniel Ikpefan from  Toulon 
 Guillaume Ducat from  Bayonne
 Alexis Levron from  Vannes
 Jordan Joseph from  Racing 92 (season-long loan)

Players Out
 Denis Marchois to  Bayonne 
 Malik Hamadache to  Montpellier
 Antoine Erbani to  Biarritz
 Florian Nicot to  Colomiers 
 Charly Malié to  Béziers 
 Matt Philip to  Melbourne Rebels 
 Geoffrey Moïse to  Narbonne 
 Pierrick Gunther to  Béziers 
 Julien Fumat retired 
 Watisoni Votu to  Béziers 
 Lourens Adriaanse to  Sharks 
 Hugo Bonneval released
 Samuel Marques to  Carcassonne
 Lucas Pointud released
 Mohamed Boughanmi to  Narbonne
 Atila Septar to  Toulon
 Baptiste Pesenti to  Racing 92
 Omar Odishvili to  Soyaux Angoulême
 Matthieu Ugena to  Perpignan
 Jesse Mogg to  Brumbies
 Baptiste Couchinave to  Albi
 Elton Jantjies to  NTT DoCoMo Red Hurricanes Osaka

Perpignan

Players In
 Giorgi Tetrashvili from  Agen
 Eddie Sawailau from  Valence Romans
 Arthur Joly from  La Rochelle
 Bautista Delguy from  Bordeaux
 Tristan Tedder from  Béziers
 Martín Landajo from  Harlequins 
 Mike Tadjer from  Montauban
 Sami Mavinga from  Stade Français
 Matthieu Ugena from  Pau
 Tevita Cavubati from  Harlequins
 Andrei Mahu from  London Irish
 Joaquín Oviedo from  Jaguares XV
 Brayden Wiliame from  St. George Illawarra Dragons
 Conor Carey from  Worcester Warriors
 Hugh Roach from  Austin Gilgronis

Players Out
 Quentin Walcker to  Castres
 Alban Roussel to  Bordeaux
 Quentin Étienne to  Vannes 
 Terry Philippart retired 
 Pierre Reynaud to  Carcassonne
 Pierre Lucas to  Montpellier
 Ben Volavola to  Racing 92
 Kévin Tougne to  Cognac Saint-Jean-d'Angély
 Ugo Mas to  Cognac Saint-Jean-d'Angély
 Thibault Olender to  Bourg-en-Bresse
 Thibauld Suchier to  Saint-en-Jean-Royans 
 Michael Faleafa to  Mont-de-Marsan
 Conor Carey to  Northampton Saints
 Karl Château to  Colomiers

Racing 92

Players In
 Ben Volavola from  Perpignan
 Baptiste Pesenti from  Pau
 Victor Moreaux from  Agen
 Mitch Short from  Randwick
 Anton Bresler from  Worcester Warriors
 Trevor Nyakane from  Bulls

Players Out
 François Trinh-Duc to  Bordeaux
 Simon Zebo to  Munster
 Dominic Bird to  Hurricanes
 Donnacha Ryan retired
 Antonie Claassen to  Suresnes 
 Emiliano Boffelli to  Edinburgh
 Jordan Joseph to  Pau (season-long loan)
 Dorian Laborde to  Toulon
 Kurtley Beale to  NSW Waratahs

Stade Français

Players In
 Nemo Roelofse from  Nevers 
 Romain Briatte from  Agen 
 Clément Castets from  Toulouse 
 Ngani Laumape from  Hurricanes 
 Harry Glover from  Carcassonne
 JJ van der Mescht from  Sharks

Players Out
 Jonathan Danty to  La Rochelle
 Pablo Matera to  Crusaders
 Soulemane Camara to  Chambéry 
 Stéphane Clément retired 
 Luke Tagi to  Provence
 Louis Vincent to  Montauban
 Sami Mavinga to  Perpignan
 Dylan Smith to  Ealing Trailfinders
 Gerbrandt Grobler to  Sharks

Toulon

Players In
 Julien Blanc from  Brive
 Cornell du Preez from  Worcester Warriors  
 Thomas Salles from  Aurillac 
 Kieran Brookes from  Wasps 
 Quinn Roux from  Connacht
 Jules Danglot from  Montpellier
 Lopeti Timani from  La Rochelle
 Jiuta Wainiqolo from  Fiji Sevens
 Aymeric Luc from  Bayonne
 Atila Septar from  Pau
 Leone Nakarawa from  Glasgow Warriors 
 Petero Tuwaï from  Southern
 Cheslin Kolbe from  Toulouse 
 Mike Sosene-Feagai from  Old Glory DC
 Dorian Laborde from  Racing 92

Players Out
 Masivesi Dakuwaqa to  Montpellier
 Romain Taofifénua to  Lyon
 Jérémy Boyadjis to  Carcassonne 
 Anthony Meric to  Montauban 
 Thomas Jolmès to  Bordeaux
 Thomas Hoarau to  Béziers 
 Ma'a Nonu to  San Diego Legion
 Theo Lachaud to  Aurillac
 Levi Douglas to  Grenoble 
 Luka Chelidze to  Bayonne
 Isaia Toeava to  Bayonne 
 Sébastien Taofifénua to  Lyon
 Daniel Ikpefan to  Pau
 Rudi Wulf retired
 Ramiro Moyano to  Edinburgh
 Bastien Soury to  Biarritz
 Erwan Dridi to  Vannes (season-long loan)

Toulouse

Players In
 Anthony Jelonch from  Castres
 Tim Nanai-Williams from  Clermont

Players Out
 Yoann Huget retired 
 Jerome Kaino retired
 Clément Castets to  Stade Français
 Louis-Benoît Madaule to  Narbonne 
 Maxime Marty to  Carcassonne 
 Guillaume Marchand to  Lyon
 Carl Axtens to  Narbonne
 Thibault Hamonou to  Pau
 Théo Idjellidaine to  Agen (season-long loan)
 Cheslin Kolbe to  Toulon

See also
List of 2021–22 Premiership Rugby transfers
List of 2021–22 United Rugby Championship transfers
List of 2021–22 Super Rugby transfers
List of 2021–22 RFU Championship transfers
List of 2021–22 Rugby Pro D2 transfers
List of 2021–22 Major League Rugby transfers

References

2020-21
2021–22 Top 14 season